Alan Haines (6 June 1924 – 17 April 2011) was a British actor and playwright who spent four years in the Royal Navy during World War II — including at D-Day on his 20th birthday and appeared in many West End shows and touring productions, as well as in the cult TV series Dad's Army and Van der Valk and two notable films: Dad's Army and The Man in the White Suit, and the acclaimed BBC TV Series Perfect Strangers.

He died in Charing Cross Hospital on 17 April 2011.

Works
 The Prince of Portobello Play (1962)
 Autobiography Haines (2006) The Mad Mad-Century Rag London: MER Publishing (2007),

Selected filmography
 The Man in the White Suit (1951) - Reporter (uncredited)
 The Eyes of Annie Jones (1964) - Const. Marlowe
 Dad's Army (1971) - Marine Officer

References

External links

1924 births
2011 deaths
Royal Navy sailors
Royal Navy personnel of World War II
People from Weston-super-Mare
British male stage actors
British male television actors
British male film actors
British male dramatists and playwrights
20th-century British dramatists and playwrights
20th-century British male writers
20th-century British writers